Neil Davies may refer to:

 Neil Davies (Australian footballer) (1931–2009), Australian rules footballer
 Neil Davies (rugby league), Welsh rugby league footballer who played in the 2000s

See also
Neil Davis (disambiguation)